Albert Awachie (born October 7, 1992) is a Canadian football fullback for the Saskatchewan Roughriders of the Canadian Football League (CFL). He played CIS football for the Toronto Varsity Blues.

Although he rarely touches the ball, he is a key blocker and special teams player recognized by coaches and teammates for his tenacity and fearlessness.

Early life
Awachie was born in Toronto, Ontario on October 7, 1992. Being the youngest of five siblings instilled in him a drive and work ethic that was reaffirmed by his parents, Raphael and Florence, who had emigrated from Nigeria. While in the first grade, he moved to Fort Collins, Colorado to stay with his mother, spending the summers back in Toronto with his father. Although he grew up mostly playing soccer, his older brother Martin invited him to join the football team. He played multiple positions at Rocky Mountain High School, even picking up all-league honors as a defensive lineman. After graduation, he moved back to Toronto.

College career
Awachie played CIS football for the Toronto Varsity Blues from 2013 to 2016, beginning as a wide receiver and later playing some defensive back. Initially joining as a walk-on, he played in 22 games in his college career, registering 14 receptions for 145 yards as well as 22 tackles on defense. He missed the entire 2015 season after he dislocated his knee, tearing the bicep tendon, LCL and ACL, and doctors told him there was a 50 percent chance he would be able to return to football. After ten months of rehab he was able to come back his senior season and rank third on the team with 13 receptions and 134 yards.

Professional career
After going undrafted in the 2017 CFL draft, Awachie signed a free-agent deal with the Saskatchewan Roughriders in May. He made his professional debut in the 2017 season opener on June 22 against the Montreal Alouettes.

Awachie spent his first two years as a backup to fullback Spencer Moore on the depth chart, appearing in 12 games without registering a carry.  Bouncing between the main and practice rosters, he also occasionally filled in for injuries on special teams. Moore was traded to the Montreal Alouettes in December 2018, opening the door for more playing time for Awachie. In 2019 he stepped into a larger role on special teams and established himself as a reliable blocker for an offense that ran for over 2,000 yards and a league-best 26 touchdowns. He recorded his first-ever CFL statistic in week 2: a four-yard reception against the Ottawa Redblacks. He got his second catch in week 16, an eight-yard pass from Cody Fajardo against the Toronto Argonauts in Toronto with his parents in attendance.

He was signed to a two-year extension in January 2020.

References

External links
 Saskatchewan Roughriders bio

Living people
1992 births
Canadian football fullbacks
Saskatchewan Roughriders players
Toronto Varsity Blues football players
Players of Canadian football from Ontario
Canadian football people from Toronto
Sportspeople from Fort Collins, Colorado
Canadian emigrants to the United States
Canadian sportspeople of Nigerian descent
Black Canadian players of Canadian football